First Cousin Once Removed is a 2012 American documentary film directed by Alan Berliner. The film premiered at the New York Film Festival in October 2012. The film is about the life of the poet, translator, critic, and university professor Edwin Honig and his struggles with Alzheimer's disease. Honig and Berliner were  first cousins once removed.

References

External links

2012 films
American documentary films
Documentary films about dementia
Documentary films about poets
2010s English-language films
2010s American films